Martin Turner (born September 1950) is an English stage and television actor.

Early life
Turner was born in Hong Kong. In the 1970s he was a member of the Inter-Action Community Arts Trust founded by E. D. Berman, before deciding to train as an actor at the Drama Centre, London, under Yat Malmgren and Christopher Fettes.

Career

Theatre
His stage career has been distinguished by playing lead roles for Cheek by Jowl (including Oberon/Theseus in their world tour of A Midsummer Night's Dream), the Royal Shakespeare Company, Liverpool Everyman Theatre, Royal Exchange, Manchester, Open Air Theatre, Regent's Park, Shakespeare's Globe, Birmingham Repertory Theatre, Sheffield Crucible, Chichester Festival Theatre and other companies.

On the West End stage he has played Evelyn Oakleigh opposite Elaine Paige in Anything Goes, and Pierre Guerre in Martin Guerre (both at the Prince Edward Theatre); Ronald Reagan in Gaddafi at the English National Opera; Father in Rabbit at Trafalgar Studios; Banquo, at the Gielgud Theatre, in the highly acclaimed Macbeth directed by Rupert Goold and starring Patrick Stewart, which transferred to New York's BAM Harvey Theatre and Broadway; and as Juror 11 in Twelve Angry Men at the Garrick Theatre.

Television
His featured roles on television include John Harrison in Agatha Christie's Poirot (Wasp's Nest); Neil Spicer in Rosemary & Thyme; Charles in Prince William, Cimon in Son (ABC/Fox); Wing-Commander Turner in Foyle's War (Series 2 & 3); Charles I in Charles II: The Power and The Passion; William Wilberforce in Breaking the Chains; Arthur Ernest Percival in The Somme - From Defeat to Victory; Frogton in Killer Net; Tim Pye in The Money Men; as well as guest roles in Holby City, Casualty, The Bill, The Knock, Pie in the Sky, Trainer, Dangerfield, Bergerac, and Rumpole of the Bailey.

References

External links

Living people
English male stage actors
1950 births
English male television actors